Josephine Crawley Quinn is a historian and archaeologist, working across Greek, Roman and Phoenician history. Quinn is a Professor of Ancient History in the Faculty of Classics and Martin Frederiksen Fellow and Tutor in Ancient History at Worcester College, University of Oxford.

Career 
Quinn obtained a BA in Classics in 1996 from Wadham College, Oxford. She then obtained an MA (1998) and PhD (2003) in Ancient History and Mediterranean Archaeology at the University of California, Berkeley. In 2001-2002 she was the Ralegh Radford Rome Scholar at the British School at Rome. In 2003-2004 she was a College Lecturer in Ancient History at St John's College, and she has been at Worcester College since 2004. In 2008 she was a visiting scholar at the Getty Villa.

Quinn is co-director of the Oxford Centre for Phoenician and Punic Studies, and co-director of the Tunisian-British Excavations at Utica, Tunisia with Andrew Wilson and Elizabeth Fentress.

Between 2006 and 2011, Quinn served as the editor of the Papers of the British School at Rome.

Quinn won the Zvi Meitar/Vice-Chancellor Oxford University Research Prize in the Humanities in 2009. She has published numerous articles and two co-edited volumes, the Hellenistic West, and The Punic Mediterranean. In 2018 Quinn published the monograph In Search of the Phoenicians, described as a pioneering and exhilarating volume, which argues that the idea of the Phoenicians as a distinct, self-identifying group, is a modern invention. The book was awarded the Society for Classical Studies Goodwin Award of Merit in 2019.

Quinn contributes to the London Review of Books and the New York Review of Books, and has appeared on BBC Radio Three and Four.

Personal life
Quinn is the daughter of the former MEP Christine Crawley, Baroness Crawley.

Selected publications 
Quinn, J.C. 2010. The reinvention of Lepcis. In Bollettino di Archeologia ON LINE. Roma 2008 - International Congress of Classical Archaeology Meetings Between Cultures in the Ancient Mediterranean.
Quinn, J. and Wilson, A. 2013. Capitolia. Journal of Roman Studies 103: 117–173.
Quinn, J.C., McLynn, N, Kerr and R.M., Hadas, D. 2014. Augustine's Canaanities. Papers of the British School at Rome 82: 175–197.
Quinn, J.C. and Vella, N.C. 2014. The Punic Mediterranean: Identities and Identification from Phoenician Settlement to Roman Rule. Cambridge: Cambridge University Press.
Quinn, J.C. 2017. Translating empire from Carthage to Rome. Classical Philology 112(3): 312–331.
Quinn, J. 2018. In Search of the Phoenicians. Princeton: Princeton University Press.

References 

Alumni of Wadham College, Oxford
Fellows of Worcester College, Oxford
University of California, Berkeley alumni
Women classical scholars
Academics of the University of Oxford
British women archaeologists
Phoenician-punic archaeologists
Daughters of life peers
Classical scholars